The Mirrored Heavens is a science fiction novel by David J. Williams. This is the author's debut novel, and the first volume in his Autumn Rain trilogy, which continues with The Burning Skies and The Machinery Of Light. The story begins in the year 2110 where global political power is balanced between the United States and the Eurasian Coalition (a primarily Chinese and Russian alliance). These two powers jointly constructed a space elevator, which is destroyed by a terrorist attack before it can become operational.

The story follows the United States intelligence agents who are attempting to catch those responsible.

Publication history
2008, United States, Bantam Spectra , Pub date 21 May 2008, Hardback 
2008, United States, Spectra , Pub date 20 May 2008, Paperback 
2008, United States, Spectra , Pub date 20 May 2008, eBook 
2009, United States, Spectra , Pub date 27 January 2009, Paperback

References

External links
 Review by John Scalzi

2008 American novels
American science fiction novels
Novels set in the 22nd century
Space elevator
2008 debut novels
Bantam Spectra books